Egor Alexeyevich Golovkin (born 9 December 1983 in Moscow) is a Russian former pair skater. With former partner Tatiana Kokoreva, he is the 2005 World Junior bronze medalist. 

Prior to Kokoreva, he skated with Maria Mukhortova. After splitting from Kokoreva, Golovkin teamed up with Canadian Jericho Boulin but the pair withdrew from the 2007 Canadian Championships before the short program.

Programs 
(with Kokoreva)

Competitive highlights 
(with Kokoreva)

References

External links
 

Russian male pair skaters
Living people
1983 births
Figure skaters from Moscow
World Junior Figure Skating Championships medalists